A Book of Luminous Things is the fifth studio album by the Polish jazz singer Aga Zaryan.
It was released on June 14, 2011 by EMI Music Poland and  Blue Note Records.

The album contains twelve compositions to the poems of Czesław Miłosz and his favourite poets: Anna Świrszczyńska, Jane Hirshfield and Denise Levertov. In October, 2011 EMI Music Poland published another version of the album, called Księga olśnień (which is the Polish translation of A Book of Luminous Things) with the same songs being performed in Polish. Apart from the language, the only difference between the two versions is in the song This Only (Polish: To jedno), which in the English version is performed by Aga Zaryan as sole vocalist, while in the Polish version she was joined by Grzegorz Turnau.

Recorded at Castle Oaks Studios in Calabasas, California in spring 2011.

Track listing

Personnel
Aga Zaryan – vocals
Michał Tokaj – piano
Larry Koonse – guitar
Darek Oleszkiewicz – double bass
Munyungo Jackson – percussion

Certifications

References

External links
 Aga Zaryan sings Miłosz

Aga Zaryan albums
2011 albums